Delia Narayan "Didi" Contractor (née Kinzinger; 1929 – July 5, 2021) was an American artist and builder known for her work on the vernacular traditions in India, using adobe, bamboo and stone for materials. She was a recipient of the Nari Shakti Puraskar, India's highest civilian award for recognising the achievements and contributions of women.

Life
Born Delia Kinzinger in Minneapolis, she was the daughter of expressionist painters Edmund Kinzinger and Alice Fish Kinzinger, both associated with the Bauhaus movement. Her father was German, from Pforzheim, Grand Duchy of Baden. Her mother was American. Her parents married in Germany in 1927, and moved to Minneapolis where her father worked as an exchange teacher. They returned to Germany, but left it for Paris in 1933. They moved to Waco, Texas in 1935, where her father was first assistant professor, later professor and finally head of the Art Department of Baylor University.

She grew up in New Mexico and Texas, and took a year off from school to work in theatre, She was first trained in art by her father and Hans Hofmann in New York, and then studied art at the University of Colorado Boulder, where she met her husband, Narayan Contractor. They moved to Nashik in the 1950s, and to Mumbai in the 1960s, raising four children. After separating from her husband she moved to Andretta, an artists’ village established by Norah Richards in the Kangra Valley of Himachal Pradesh in the 1970s. 

Contractor's daughter is author and academic Kirin Narayan. Narayan has written about the Contractor household in Mumbai, in a beachside compound in Juhu which Contractor ran as a combination youth hostel and literary salon, in her memoir My Family and Other Saints. Her son Devendra Contractor trained as an architect and practices in Santa Fe, New Mexico.The children studied in the U.S.

Contractor died at home in Sidhbari on July 5, 2021, at age 91.

Buildings

Contractor was self-taught in architecture and was inspired as a child by a talk by Frank Lloyd Wright. She specialised in buildings that fit into, rather than contrast with, the landscape, and are made of natural local materials: mainly mud, bamboo, and stone, with small amounts of deodar wood. They also include frequent use of staircases as a design element. They can be found in the area around Dharamsala, and include over 15 homes and three institutions, including the Nishtha Rural Health, Education and Environment Center in  Sidhbari, the Sambhaavnaa Institute of Public Policy and Politics in Palampur, and the Dharmalaya Institute in Bir.

Recognition
Contractor was the subject of two feature films, Earth Crusader (2016), and Didi Contractor: Marrying the Earth to the Building (2017). She was the 2017 winner of the Women Artists, Architects and Designers (WADe) Asia Life Time Achievement Award.

In 2019 the president of India gave her the Nari Shakti Puraskar, India's highest civilian award for recognising the achievements and contributions of women.

References

External links
 
 . Silverstone's photo-essay on Didi Contractor, "East-West wife", was published in Coronet magazine, November 1960.
 Narayan, Kirin: My Family & Other Saints (excerpts) press.uchicago.edu
 Singh, Joginder: Didi Contractor / Ideas and Concerns (interview) immaterialonline.com

1929 births
2021 deaths
21st-century American architects
20th-century Indian architects
University of Colorado Boulder alumni
Nari Shakti Puraskar winners
American emigrants to India
20th-century American architects
American women architects
Indian women architects
Architects from New Mexico
Architects from Texas
American people of German descent
Indian people of German descent
20th-century American women
21st-century American women
20th-century Indian women